The 2007 MTV Movie Awards took place on June 3, 2007 (June 4 in Europe) at Gibson Amphitheatre in Universal City, California and were hosted by Sarah Silverman. The ceremony featured performances by Rihanna featuring Jay-Z, who performed "Umbrella", and Amy Winehouse, who performed "Rehab". It was the first MTV Movie Awards show broadcast live to American audiences, and it was located at the Gibson Amphitheatre in Universal City, California.
Mark Burnett directed the show and executive produced this year's ceremony. Nominees were announced on April 30, 2007, and the voting for the main categories ran until the end of May.

A pre-recorded movie parody included Sarah Silverman re-enacting with the characters from Babel, Dreamgirls, The Pursuit of Happyness, The Departed, 300, The Devil Wears Prada, and Transformers.
Sarah Silverman repeatedly made negative jokes towards Paris Hilton, which caused mixed reactions from the general audience. The audience at the Gibson Amphitheatre, however, were cheering after Silverman stated that Paris was going to jail very soon.

The pre-show was the subject of a rather vociferous ad campaign for the upcoming summer flick Transformers (distributed by Paramount Pictures, a subsidiary of Viacom, which also owns MTV), which included an extended interview with star Shia LaBeouf, several sneak previews, a "real-life" example of a car used in the movie, etc. The focus on the film was further reinforced when the film won in the category "Best Summer Movie You Haven't Seen Yet." The pre-show also included Hilton's last interview before entering jail.

Performers 
 Rihanna featuring Jay-Z — "Umbrella"
 Amy Winehouse — "Rehab"

Presenters
 Jessica Alba, Chris Evans, Michael Chiklis, and Ioan Gruffudd — presented Best Villain
 Bruce Willis and Justin Long — presented Best Fight
 Dane Cook — presented Movie Spoof Finalists
 Chris Tucker and Victoria Beckham — introduced Rihanna and Jay-Z
 Adam Sandler, Kevin James, and Jessica Biel — presented Best Kiss
 Web Wall Viewer, Kathy — presented Breakthrough Performance
 Robin Williams, Mandy Moore, and John Krasinski — presented Best Comedic Performance
 Cameron Diaz —  presented the MTV Generation Award
 Samuel L. Jackson — presented Best Movie Spoof
 Bruce Willis — introduced Amy Winehouse
 Seth Rogen and Eva Mendes — presented Best Summer Movie You Haven't Seen Yet
 Shia LaBeouf, Josh Duhamel, and Tyrese Gibson — presented Best Performance
 John Travolta, Zac Efron, and Amanda Bynes — presented Best Movie

Awards 
{| class="wikitable"
|-
! colspan="2" style="background:#EEDD82;"| Best Movie
|-
| colspan="2" valign="top" |
Pirates of the Caribbean: Dead Man's Chest
 300
 Blades of Glory
 Borat
 Little Miss Sunshine
|-
! style="background:#EEDD82;" width="50%"| Best Performance
! style="background:#EEDD82;" width="50%"| Breakthrough Performance
|-
| valign="top" |
Johnny Depp – Pirates of the Caribbean: Dead Man's Chest
 Gerard Butler – 300
 Jennifer Hudson – Dreamgirls
 Keira Knightley – Pirates of the Caribbean: Dead Man's Chest
 Beyoncé – Dreamgirls
 Will Smith – The Pursuit of Happyness
| valign="top" |
Jaden Smith – The Pursuit of Happyness
 Emily Blunt – The Devil Wears Prada
 Abigail Breslin – Little Miss Sunshine
 Lena Headey – 300
 Mary Elizabeth Winstead – Final Destination 3
 Justin Timberlake – Alpha Dog
|-
! style="background:#EEDD82;"| Best Villain
! style="background:#EEDD82;"| Best Comedic Performance
|-
| valign="top" |
Jack Nicholson – The Departed
 Tobin Bell – Saw III
 Bill Nighy – Pirates of the Caribbean: Dead Man's Chest
 Rodrigo Santoro – 300
 Meryl Streep – The Devil Wears Prada
| valign="top" |
Sacha Baron Cohen – Borat: Cultural Learnings of America for Make Benefit Glorious Nation of Kazakhstan
 Emily Blunt – The Devil Wears Prada
 Will Ferrell – Blades of Glory
 Adam Sandler – Click
 Ben Stiller – Night at the Museum
|-
! style="background:#EEDD82;"| Best Kiss
! style="background:#EEDD82;"| Best Fight
|-
| valign="top" |
Will Ferrell and Sacha Baron Cohen – Talladega Nights: The Ballad of Ricky Bobby
 Cameron Diaz and Jude Law – The Holiday
 Columbus Short and Meagan Good – Stomp the Yard
 Mark Wahlberg and Elizabeth Banks – Invincible
 Marlon Wayans and Brittany Daniel – Little Man
| valign="top" |Gerard Butler vs. the Uber Immortal – 300 Jack Black and Héctor Jiménez vs. Los Duendes – Nacho Libre
 Sacha Baron Cohen vs. Ken Davitian – Borat: Cultural Learnings of America for Make Benefit Glorious Nation of Kazakhstan
 Will Ferrell vs. Jon Heder – Blades of Glory
 Uma Thurman vs. Anna Faris – My Super Ex-Girlfriend
|-
! style="background:#EEDD82;"| Best Summer Movie You Haven't Seen Yet
! style="background:#EEDD82;"| Fair One Best Filmmaker on Campus
|-
| valign="top" |Transformers Rush Hour 3
 Hairspray
 Fantastic Four: Rise of the Silver Surfer 
 Spider-Man 3
 Evan Almighty
 Harry Potter and the Order of the Phoenix
 I Now Pronounce You Chuck and Larry
 The Simpsons Movie
| valign="top" |Josh Greenbaum – Border Patrol (from University of Southern California) Robert Dastoli – Southwestern Orange County vs. The Flying Saucers (from University of Central Florida)
 Maria Gigante – Girls Room (from Columbia College Chicago)
 Alexander Poe – Please Forget I Exist (from Columbia University)
 Andrew Shipsides – Bottleneck (from Savannah College of Art & Design)
|-
! style="background:#EEDD82;"| MTV Movie Spoof Award
! style="background:#EEDD82;"| Orbit Dirtiest Mouth Moment
|-
| valign="top" |United 300 – Andy Signore Texas Chainsaw Musical – Paul Morrell and Zan Passante
 Texas Chainsaw Massacre: The Rehab – Noah Harald
 Casino Royale with Cheese – Bill Caco
 Quentin Tarantino's Little Miss Squirtgun – Velcro Troupe
| valign="top" |Jason Mewes and Kevin Smith – Clerks II Alicia Keys and Common – Smokin' Aces
 Steve-O – Jackass Number Two
 Dax Shepard and Efren Ramirez – Employee of the Month
|}
MTV Generation AwardMike Myers'''

References

 2007
Mtv Movie Awards
MTV Movie Awards
2007 in Los Angeles
2007 in American cinema